Victor Albert George Child Villiers, 7th Earl of Jersey,  (20 March 1845 – 31 May 1915) was a British banker, Conservative politician and colonial administrator from the Villiers family. He served as Governor of New South Wales between 1891 and 1893.

Background and education
Born at Berkeley Square, London, Lord Jersey was the eldest son of George Child Villiers, 6th Earl of Jersey, and Julia Peel, daughter of Prime Minister Sir Robert Peel, Bt. He was educated at Eton and Balliol College, Oxford. He succeeded to the earldom in October 1859, aged 14, on the death of his father, who had only succeeded his father three weeks earlier. He became the principal proprietor of the family banking firm of Child & Co.

Political career
Lord Jersey served as a Lord-in-waiting (government whip in the House of Lords) between 1875 and 1877 in the Conservative administration of Benjamin Disraeli. He returned to the government in 1889 when Lord Salisbury made him Paymaster-General, which he remained until 1890. The latter year he was sworn of the Privy Council and made a Knight Grand Cross of the Order of St Michael and St George (GCMG).

In August 1890 Jersey was appointed Governor of New South Wales. He arrived in Australia to take up his position in January 1891. According to the Australian Dictionary of Biography, there were no major political difficulties during his term. He was described by Sir Henry Parkes as "amiable and well-intentioned", but "very much occupied with his own family". He "did not excel as a public speaker". He was the official host at the 1891 Australasian National Convention in Sydney. Jersey tendered his resignation already in November 1892 citing pressing business affairs. This did not go down well with the Colonial Office in London. Lord Salisbury thought that Jersey had found that there was "less individual power to his office than he imagined". Jersey himself wrote to the Colonial Secretary: "the duties and responsibilities of a governor can hardly be called serious nowadays being chiefly of a social character". He left Australia in March 1893.

Lord Jersey represented the United Kingdom at the 1894 Colonial Conference in Ottawa, Ontario, Canada. He also acted as Agent-General for New South Wales in London between 1903 and 1905 and through his ties with the banking institutions helped the state's loan negotiations. He revisited Australia in 1905 and Prime Minister Alfred Deakin considered appointing him Australia's first High Commissioner to London, although nothing came out of this.

One of Lord Jersey's godparents was Queen Victoria. The Queen accepted her role as a token of friendship to Robert Peel, Prime Minister, who was Lord Jersey's grandfather (his mother, the 6th Countess, being Julia Peel).

Other public appointments
On 18 June 1875 the Earl was appointed Honorary Colonel of the 1st Glamorganshire Artillery Volunteers. Lord Jersey was Lord Lieutenant of Oxfordshire from 1877 and from 1885 also served as a Deputy Lieutenant of Warwickshire and as a Justice of the Peace for Warwickshire and Oxfordshire. He was Paymaster-General from 1889 to 1890. In 1894, he was sent to Ottawa to act as the British government's representative to the 1894 Colonial Conference.

From 1896 to 1905 he was Chairman of the Light Railway Commission. He was made a Knight Grand Cross of the Order of the Bath in the 1900 Birthday Honours.

Freemasonry
A Freemason, he was initiated to the craft on 25 October 1865 in the Apollo University Lodge No. 357 at the age of 20. In December 1865 he was passed in the Churchill Lodge No. 478 and in February 1866 he was raised in his Mother Lodge. In 1870 he was appointed Senior Grand Warden of the United Grand Lodge of England and served for a year. In 1885 he was appointed Provincial Grand Master of Oxfordshire. When he became Governor of New South Wales, he became a member of the Lodge Ionic No. 65. On 11 June 1891 he was installed Grand Master of the Grand Lodge of New South Wales.

Family

Lord Jersey married the Hon. Margaret Elizabeth Leigh (29 October 1849 – 22 May 1945), daughter and eldest child of William Henry Leigh, 2nd Baron Leigh, on 19 September 1872. They had six children:
 George Henry Robert Child Villiers, 8th Earl of Jersey (1873–1923)
 Lady Margaret Child Villiers (1874–1874), died in infancy.
 Lady Margaret Child Villiers (1875–1959), married Walter Rice, 7th Baron Dynevor, and had issue.
 Lady Mary Julia Child Villiers (1877–1933), married Thomas Pakenham, 5th Earl of Longford, and had issue.
 Lady Beatrice Child Villiers (1880–1970), married Edward Plunkett, 18th Baron of Dunsany, and had issue.
 Hon. Arthur George Child Villiers (1883–1969)

Having suffered a stroke in 1909, Lord Jersey died at Osterley Park, Middlesex, in May 1915, aged 70. He was succeeded in the earldom by his eldest son, George. The Countess of Jersey survived her husband by 30 years and died at Middleton Park, Oxfordshire, in May 1945, aged 95.

References

 

1845 births
1915 deaths
19th-century English nobility
20th-century English nobility
Governors of New South Wales
Agents-General for New South Wales
United Kingdom Paymasters General
Lord-Lieutenants of Oxfordshire
Members of the Privy Council of the United Kingdom
Conservative Party (UK) Baronesses- and Lords-in-Waiting
7
Knights Grand Cross of the Order of St Michael and St George
Knights Grand Cross of the Order of the Bath
Victor Child Villiers, 7th Earl of Jersey
Wales Rugby Union officials
Alumni of Balliol College, Oxford
Presidents of the Marylebone Cricket Club
Australian Freemasons
Masonic Grand Masters
Colony of New South Wales people
Earls in the Jacobite peerage
Viscounts Grandison